Right on Time is the second album by the Los Angeles, California-based duo Brothers Johnson. Released in 1977, the album peaked at number two on the R&B albums chart and number thirteen on the pop albums chart in the U.S. It includes the number-one R&B song, Strawberry Letter 23, and winner of a Grammy Award in 1978 for Best R&B Instrumental Performance, "Q".

Critical reception
In a contemporary review for The Village Voice, music critic Robert Christgau gave the album a "C+" grade and panned the duo for how "bland" and lifeless they made their funk: "Pop professionalism reduced to a concept in which all annoyances and other signs of life are eliminated". In a retrospective review, Allmusic's Stephen Cook gave it four-and-a-half out of five stars and credited Quincy Jones for producing a "seamless mix of pop and funk".

Track listing
"Runnin' For Your Lovin'" - (George Johnson, Louis Johnson)  5:05
"Free Yourself, Be Yourself" - (George Johnson, Louis Johnson)  4:14
"Q" (Instrumental) - (George Johnson, Louis Johnson)  3:25
"Right On Time" - (George Johnson, Louis Johnson, Quincy Jones)  3:50
"Strawberry Letter 23" - (Shuggie Otis)  4:58
"Brother Man" (Instrumental) - (Dave Grusin, George Johnson, Louis Johnson) 3:10
"Never Leave You Lonely" - (Louis Johnson, Peggy Jones, Valerie Johnson)  3:02
"Love Is" - (George Johnson, Louis Johnson, Peggy Jones, Quincy Jones)  4:20

Personnel
 George Johnson – Lead Guitar, Lead and Backing Vocals
 Louis Johnson – Bass, Guitar, Piano, Synthesizer, Lead and Backing Vocals
 Harvey Mason, Sr. – Drums
 Lee Ritenour, David T. Walker – Guitar
 Dave Grusin, Ian Underwood, Michael Boddicker – Keyboards, Synthesizer
 Ralph MacDonald – Percussion
 Mic Gillette – Trombone, Trumpet
 Emilio Castillo – Tenor Saxophone
 Stephen Kupka –  Baritone Saxophone
 Lenny Pickett – Alto Saxophone
 Greg Adams – Trumpet
 Alex Weir, Jim Gilstrap, Richard Heath, Mortonette Jenkins, Stephanie Spruill, Oren Waters, Alexandra Brown – Backing Vocals

Charts and certifications

Charts

Singles

Certifications

References

External links
 

1977 albums
The Brothers Johnson albums
A&M Records albums
Albums produced by Quincy Jones
Albums recorded at A&M Studios